Jennifer Pöltl (born 4 August 1993) is an Austrian football midfielder currently playing for SKN St. Pölten in the ÖFB-Frauenliga.

She is a member of the Austrian national team who was part of the 2014 Algarve Cup squad and played 2015 FIFA Women's World Cup qualification matches.

References

External links 
 

1993 births
Living people
Austrian women's footballers
Austria women's international footballers
Women's association football midfielders
FSK St. Pölten-Spratzern players
Women's association football forwards
ÖFB-Frauenliga players
FC Südburgenland players